Shalva BaMidbar (lit. Peace in the Desert), also known as Beit HaShanti BaMidbar (Shanti House in the Desert) is a village in southern Israel. Located near Sde Boker, it falls under the jurisdiction of Ramat HaNegev Regional Council. In 2019 it had a population of 30.

The village was established in 2009, replicating the Shanti House model in Tel Aviv. It aims to help homeless youth return to a normal life. The village has an emphasis on green construction and also provides for children with special needs.

References

Populated places established in 2009
2009 establishments in Israel
Populated places in Southern District (Israel)